Kampong Cham may refer to:

 Kampong Cham province
 Kampong Cham (city)
 Kampong Cham municipality
 Kampong Cham Commune
 Kampong Cham Airport
 Kampong Cham (National Assembly constituency) 
 Apostolic Prefecture of Kompong Cham